Franz Schiewer (born ) is a German track and road cyclist. He competed in the points race event at the 2011 UCI Track Cycling World Championships.

Major results

2008
 2nd Overall 3-Etappen-Rundfahrt
2009
 1st Overall Tour de Berlin
2010
 1st  Points race, National Track Championships
 7th Overall Tour de Berlin
2011
 National Track Championships
1st  Team pursuit
2nd Scratch
2013
 1st  Team pursuit, National Track Championships
2016
 2nd  Stayer, UEC European Track Championships
2017
 1st  Stayer, UEC European Track Championships
2018
 1st  Stayer, UEC European Track Championships

References

External links
 Profile at cyclingarchives.com

1990 births
Living people
Sportspeople from Forst (Lausitz)
German track cyclists
German male cyclists
Cyclists from Brandenburg